van Bredael or Van Bredael is a Flemish surname. Notable people with the surname include:

Alexander van Bredael (1663–1720), Flemish painter
Jan Frans van Bredael (1686–1750), Flemish painter
Jan Pieter van Bredael the Younger (1683–1735), Flemish painter
Joris van Bredael (1661–c. 1706), Flemish painter
Joseph van Bredael (1688–1739), Flemish painter
Peeter van Bredael (1629–1719), Flemish painter

References